Jennifer Lim may refer to:

 Jennifer Lim (British actress) (born 1982), British actress
 Jennifer Lim (theatre actress) (born 1979), Chinese/Korean theatre actress